Daniel Ellis Williams (born June 1, 1987) is a former American football defensive tackle. He was drafted by the Arizona Cardinals in the first round of the 2010 NFL Draft. He played college football at Tennessee. He has also played for the Oakland Raiders.

Early years
Williams attended Memphis East High School in Memphis, Tennessee. As a senior, he had 132 tackles, five sacks, four forced fumbles and two fumble recoveries.

Regarded as a three-star recruit by Rivals.com, Williams was ranked as the No. 35 defensive tackle in a class highlighted by DeMarcus Granger and Callahan Bright, and that also included Ndamukong Suh and Tyson Alualu.

College career
Williams attended the University of Tennessee from 2005 to 2009. As a senior, he was a second-team All-SEC selection by the league's coaches after recording 62 tackles and two sacks. He finished his career with 153 tackles and six sacks.

Professional career
After a "tremendous" senior season, Williams was projected a first-round selection by Sports Illustrated. He was ranked the third best defensive tackle available in the 2010 NFL Draft, behind only Ndamukong Suh and Gerald McCoy.

Arizona Cardinals
Williams was drafted by the Arizona Cardinals 26th overall in the 2010 NFL Draft. He signed a 5-year, $10.335 million contract on August 2, 2010. As a rookie Williams played in 15 games totaling 37 tackles and had 2 passes defended. In 2011, Williams was the starting Nose Tackle. In his first career start against Carolina, Williams led the defensive line with 4 solo tackles including 1 for a loss. On November 20, 2011, in the 4th quarter against San Francisco, Williams broke his arm and was placed on injured reserve ending his season. Williams finished the season playing in 10 games (starting all 10), totaling 20 tackles, and 2 passes defended. He appeared in 15 games with 11 starts in 2012 with 41 tackles on the season. On September 8, 2013, Williams intercepted a pass from Sam Bradford and returned it 2 yards for a touchdown. On September 21, 2013, his father died in a car accident, driving to New Orleans to see his son play.

Oakland Raiders
On March 11, 2015, Williams signed with the Oakland Raiders.

On April 18, 2017, the Raiders released Williams.

NFL statistics

Personal life 
Dan spends his offseason in Memphis, where he is a hands-on dad and husband to his eleven year-old daughter, McKayla and his wife Tia. Off the field, Dan is committed to serving others, especially in the areas of education and health and wellness, specifically preventing diabetes in the African American community with his Filling the Gaps Foundation. He is also an ambassador for the American Diabetes Association and is a member of Team Tackle, work he dedicates to the memory of his late father who died in 2013.

References

External links
Oakland Raiders bio
Arizona Cardinals bio
Tennessee Volunteers bio

1987 births
Living people
Players of American football from Memphis, Tennessee
American football defensive tackles
Tennessee Volunteers football players
Arizona Cardinals players
Oakland Raiders players